These are the results of the men's folding K-2 10000 metres competition in canoeing at the 1936 Summer Olympics. The K-2 event is raced by two-man canoe sprint folding kayaks. The race took place on Friday, August 7.

Twenty-six canoeists from 13 nations competed. The 1936 Games was the only time that the folding K-2 10000 metres was including in the canoeing competition.

Medalists

Final
Friday, August 7, 1936: Only a final was held.

References

1936 Summer Olympics Official Report Volume 2. p. 1026.
Sports reference.com 1936 K-2 folding 10000 m results

Men's folding K-2 10000